Abduction is an anatomical term of motion referring to a movement which draws a limb out to the side, away from the median sagittal plane of the body. It is thus  opposed to adduction.

Upper limb

Arm and shoulder
 of arm at shoulder (raising arm)
 Supraspinatus 0-15
 Deltoid 15-90

Hand and wrist
 of hand at wrist
 Flexor carpi radialis
 Extensor carpi radialis longus
 Extensor carpi radialis brevis
 of finger
 Abductor digiti minimi
 Dorsal interossei of the hand
 of thumb
 Abductor pollicis longus
 Abductor pollicis brevis

Lower limb
of femur at hip
 Gluteus maximus muscle
 Gluteus medius muscle
Gluteus minimus muscle
Sartorius muscle
Tensor fasciae latae muscle
Piriformis
of toe
Abductor hallucis
Abductor digiti minimi
Dorsal interossei of the foot

Other
 vocal folds
 Posterior cricoarytenoid muscle
 eyeball
 Lateral rectus muscle
 Superior oblique muscle
 Inferior oblique muscle

References

See also

Abductors (muscles)
Anatomical terms of motion